Perpendicular Gothic (also Perpendicular, Rectilinear, or Third Pointed) architecture was the third and final style of English Gothic architecture developed in the Kingdom of England during the Late Middle Ages, typified by large windows, four-centred arches, straight vertical and horizontal lines in the tracery, and regular arch-topped rectangular panelling. Perpendicular was the prevailing style of Late Gothic architecture in England from the 14th century to the 17th century. Perpendicular was unique to the country: no equivalent arose in Continental Europe or elsewhere in the British Isles. Of all the Gothic architectural styles, Perpendicular was the first to experience a second wave of popularity from the 18th century on in Gothic Revival architecture.

The pointed arches used in Perpendicular were often four-centred arches, allowing them to be rather wider and flatter than in other Gothic styles. Perpendicular tracery is characterized by mullions that rise vertically as far as the soffit of the window, with horizontal transoms frequently decorated with miniature crenellations. Blind panels covering the walls continued the strong straight lines of verticals and horizontals established by the tracery. Together with flattened arches and roofs, crenellations, hood mouldings, lierne vaulting, and fan vaulting were the typical stylistic features.

The chancel of Gloucester Cathedral and its latter 14th-century cloisters are early examples. Four-centred arches were often used, and lierne vaults seen in early buildings were developed into fan vaults, first at the latter 14th-century chapter house of Hereford Cathedral (demolished 1769) and cloisters at Gloucester, and then at Reginald Ely's King's College Chapel, Cambridge (1446–1461) and the brothers William and Robert Vertue's Henry VII Chapel at Westminster Abbey.

The architect and art historian Thomas Rickman's Attempt to Discriminate the Style of Architecture in England, first published in 1812, divided Gothic architecture in the British Isles into three stylistic periods. The third and final style – Perpendicular – Rickman characterised as mostly belonging to buildings built from the reign of Richard II to that of Henry VIII. From the 15th century, under the House of Tudor, the prevailing Perpendicular style is commonly known as Tudor architecture, being ultimately succeeded by Elizabethan architecture and Renaissance architecture under Elizabeth I. Rickman had excluded from his scheme most new buildings after Henry VIII's reign, calling the style of "additions and rebuilding" in the later 16th and earlier 17th centuries "often much debased".

Perpendicular followed the Decorated Gothic (or Second Pointed) style and preceded the arrival of Renaissance elements in Tudor and Elizabethan architecture. As a Late Gothic style contemporary with Flamboyant in France and elsewhere in Europe, the heyday of Perpendicular is traditionally dated from 1377 until 1547, or from the beginning of the reign of Richard II to the beginning the reign of Edward VI. Though the style rarely appeared on the European continent, it was dominant in England until the mid-16th century.

History 
In 1906 William Lethaby, Surveyor of the Fabric of Westminster Abbey, proposed that the origin of the Perpendicular style was to be found not in 14th-century Gloucester, as was traditionally argued, but in London, where the court of the House of Plantagenet was based at Westminster Palace beside Westminster Abbey. The cathedral of London, the episcopal see of the third-most senior bishop in the Church of England, was then Old St Paul's Cathedral. According to the architectural historian John Harvey, the octagonal chapter house of St Paul's, built about 1332 by William Ramsey for the cathedral canons, was the earliest example of Perpendicular Gothic. Alec Clifton-Taylor agreed that St Paul's chapter house and St Stephen's Chapel at Westminster Palace predate the early Perpendicular work at Gloucester. In the early 21st century the outline of the foundations of the chapter house was made visible in the redeveloped south churchyard of the present 17th-century cathedral.

The chapter house at St Paul's was built under the direction of William de Ramsey, who had worked on earlier phases of the still-unfinished St Stephens's Chapel. Ramsey extended the stone mullions of the windows downwards on the walls. At the top of each window he made a four-centred arch which became a distinctive feature of Perpendicular. Along with rest of Old St Paul's, the chapter house was destroyed by the Great Fire of London in 1666.

Elements of early Perpendicular are also known from St Stephen's Chapel at Westminster Palace, a palatine chapel built by King Edward I following the model of Sainte-Chapelle at the Palais de la Cité in medieval Paris. It was built in phases over a long period, from 1292 until 1348, though today only the crypt still exists. The architect of the early building was Michael of Canterbury, followed in 1323 by his son Thomas. One of the original decorative features was a kind of blind tracery; blank vertical panels with cusped, or angular tops in the interior; and, on the exterior, thin stone mullions or ribs extending downward below the windows creating perpendicular spaces. These became the most characteristic feature of the style.

The earliest Perpendicular in a major church is the choir of Gloucester Cathedral (1337–50) constructed when the south transept and choir of the then Benedictine abbey church (Gloucester was not a bishopric until after the Dissolution of the Monasteries) were rebuilt in 1331–1350. It was likely the work of one of the royal architects, either William de Ramsey, who had worked on the London cathedral chapter house, or Thomas of Canterbury, who was architect to the king when the transept of Gloucester Cathedral was begun. The architect preserved the original 11th-century walls, covering them with Flamboyant mullions and panels. The east window of Gloucester choir has a Tudor arch, filling the wall with glass. The window tracery matches the tracery on the walls.

The Henry VII Chapel at Westminster Abbey is a major example of the late Perpendicular style, with its walls of glass and elaborate fan vaults. Another important example is St George's Chapel at Windsor Castle, begun in 1475. The vault of the chapel was contracted to the master-mason John Aylmer in 1506.

Characteristics 
 Towers   were exceptionally tall, and frequently had battlements. Spires were less frequent than in earlier periods. Buttresses were often placed at the corners of the tower, the best position for providing maximum support. Notable Perpendicular towers include those of York Minster and Gloucester Cathedral, and the churches of Boston, Warwickshire and Wrexham, Taunton. 
 Stained glass windows were so large that the walls between were reduced to little more than piers. Horizontal mullions, called "transoms", often had to be added to the windows to give them greater stability.
 Tracery was a major feature of decoration. In the larger churches, the entire surface from ground to summit, including the battlements, was covered with panels of tracery composed of thin stone mullions. It also appeared frequently in the interior, and often carried the designs in the window tracery down to the floor.
 Roofs were frequently made of lead, and usually had a gentle slope, to make them easier for walking. The roof timbers on the interior were often exposed to view from below, and had ornamental supports.
 Vaults of stone were frequently elaborate and highly decorative such as fan vaulting. The increased weight of the vaults caused by the ornament was countered by larger buttresses on the exterior.
 Columns were generally circular in section, with octagonal bases and capitals.  The capitals were usually decorated with moulded or carved oak leaves, or with corbels of shields or armorial symbols, or with the Tudor rose.
 Fourth-centred arches or Tudor arches were commonly used in windows and tracery and for vaults and doorways.

Gallery

References

Bibliography 
 
 Ducher, Robert, Caractéristique des Styles, (1988), Flammarion, Paris (in French);  

 
 

 

English Gothic architecture
Gothic architecture in England
Gothic architecture in the United Kingdom
14th-century architecture
15th-century architecture
16th-century architecture
England in the High Middle Ages
Architecture in England
Gothic architecture